The Loutre River is a tributary of the northwest shore of the St. Lawrence River, flowing into the town of La Malbaie, between the towns of Cap-à-l'Aigle and Saint-Fidèle, in the Charlevoix-Est Regional County Municipality, in the administrative region of Capitale-Nationale, in Quebec, in Canada. The course of this river flows into the St. Lawrence in the hamlet of Bas-de-l'Anse, northeast of the town of La Malbaie.

The valley of this watercourse is served by route 138 (Malcolm-Fraser Blvd.) which runs along the northwest shore of the St. Lawrence River and by route Sainte-Mathilde East.

Forestry is the main economic activity of the sector; recreational tourism activities (including resort and bed and breakfasts), second.

The surface of this stream is generally frozen from mid-December to late-March. Nevertheless, safe ice traffic is generally from late December to mid-March.

Geography 
The main hydrographic slopes near the "Loutre River" are:
 North side: Port au Persil River, Noire River, Port au Saumon River, Saguenay River;
 East side: St. Lawrence River;
 South side: St. Lawrence River;
 West side: Baptiste-Jean brook, Comporté River, Jacob River, Snigole River, Malbaie River.

The Loutre River originates from a small unidentified lake in forest area. From the mouth of this head lake, the course of the Loutre River descends by traveling  according to the following segments:
  south by cutting a forest road to a bend in the river, corresponding to the confluence of a creek (coming from the east);
  south to a creek (coming from the east);
  southerly, bypassing the hamlet of Bas-de-Anse, to the bridge of route 138;
  southeasterly down the cliff in a forest area to the shore of the Gulf of St. Lawrence.

Toponymy
The origin of the name "rivière à la Loutre" is related to the presence of otters in this area.

The toponym "rivière à la Loutre" was formalized on December 5, 1968 at the Bank of place names of the Commission de toponymie du Quebec.

See also 

List of rivers of Quebec

Notes and references 

Rivers of Capitale-Nationale
Charlevoix-Est Regional County Municipality